In mathematics, the Farey sequence of order n is the sequence of completely reduced fractions, either between 0 and 1, or without this restriction, which when in lowest terms have denominators less than or equal to n, arranged in order of increasing size.

With the restricted definition, each Farey sequence starts with the value 0, denoted by the fraction , and ends with the value 1, denoted by the fraction  (although some authors omit these terms).

A Farey sequence is sometimes called a Farey series, which is not strictly correct, because the terms are not summed.

Examples
The Farey sequences of orders 1 to 8 are :
F1 = { ,  }

Farey sunburst

Plotting the numerators versus the denominators of a Farey sequence gives a shape like the one to the right, shown for 6.

Reflecting this shape around the diagonal and main axes generates the Farey sunburst, shown below. The Farey sunburst of order  connects the visible integer grid points from the origin in the square of side 2, centered at the origin. Using Pick's theorem, the area of the sunburst is 4(|n|−1), where |n| is the number of fractions in n.

History
The history of 'Farey series' is very curious — Hardy & Wright (1979)

... once again the man whose name was given to a mathematical relation was not the original discoverer so far as the records go. — Beiler (1964)

Farey sequences are named after the British geologist John Farey, Sr., whose letter about these sequences was published in the Philosophical Magazine in 1816. Farey conjectured, without offering proof, that each new term in a Farey sequence expansion is the mediant of its neighbours. Farey's letter was read by Cauchy, who provided a proof in his Exercices de mathématique, and attributed this result to Farey. In fact, another mathematician, Charles Haros, had published similar results in 1802 which were not known either to Farey or to Cauchy. Thus it was a historical accident that linked Farey's name with these sequences. This is an example of Stigler's law of eponymy.

Properties

Sequence length and index of a fraction
The Farey sequence of order n contains all of the members of the Farey sequences of lower orders. In particular Fn contains all of the members of Fn−1 and also contains an additional fraction for each number that is less than n and coprime to n.

The middle term of a Farey sequence Fn is always , 
for n > 1. From this, we can relate the lengths of Fn and Fn−1 using Euler's totient function  :

Using the fact that |F1| = 2, we can derive an expression for the length of Fn:

where  is the summatory totient.

We also have :

and by a Möbius inversion formula : 

The asymptotic behaviour of |Fn| is :

The index  of a fraction  in the Farey sequence  is simply the position that   occupies in the sequence. This is of special relevance as it is used in an alternative formulation of the Riemann hypothesis, see below. Various useful properties follow:

Farey neighbours
Fractions which are neighbouring terms in any Farey sequence are known as a Farey pair and have the following properties.

Since

this is equivalent to saying that 
.

The converse is also true. If 

for positive integers a,b,c and d with a < b and c < d then  and  will be neighbours in the Farey sequence of order max(b,d).

which first appears in the Farey sequence of order .

The total number of Farey neighbour pairs in Fn is 2|Fn| − 3.

The Stern–Brocot tree is a data structure showing how the sequence is built up from 0 (= ) and 1 (= ), by taking successive mediants.

Equivalent-area interpretation 

Every consecutive pair of Farey rationals have an equivalent area of 1.  See this by interpreting consecutive rationals r1 = p/q and r2 = p′/q′ as vectors (p, q) in the x–y plane. The area of A(p/q, p′/q′) is given by qp′ − q′p.  As any added fraction in between two previous consecutive Farey sequence fractions is calculated as the mediant (⊕), then A(r1, r1 ⊕ r2) = A(r1, r1) + A(r1, r2) = A(r1, r2) = 1 (since r1 = 1/0 and r2 = 0/1, its area must be 1).

Farey neighbours and continued fractions
Fractions that appear as neighbours in a Farey sequence have closely related continued fraction expansions. Every fraction has two continued fraction expansions — in one the final term is 1; in the other the final term is greater than 1. If , which first appears in Farey sequence Fq, has continued fraction expansions
[0; a1, a2, ..., an − 1, an, 1]
[0; a1, a2, ..., an − 1, an + 1]

[0; a1, a2, ..., an]

and its other neighbour has a continued fraction expansion 
[0; a1, a2, ..., an − 1]

Farey fractions and the least common multiple
The lcm can be expressed as the products of Farey fractions as

where  is the second Chebyshev function.

Farey fractions and the greatest common divisor
Since the Euler's totient function is directly connected to the gcd so is the number of elements in Fn,

For any 3 Farey fractions ,  and  the following identity between the gcd's of the 2x2 matrix determinants in absolute value holds:

Applications
Farey sequences are very useful to find rational approximations of irrational numbers. For example, the construction by Eliahou of a lower bound on the length of non-trivial cycles in the 3x+1 process uses Farey sequences to calculate a continued fraction expansion of the number log2(3).

In physical systems with resonance phenomena, Farey sequences provide a very elegant and efficient method to compute resonance locations in 1D and 2D.

Farey sequences are prominent in studies of any-angle path planning on square-celled grids, for example in characterizing their computational complexity or optimality. The connection can be considered in terms of r-constrained paths, namely paths made up of line segments that each traverse at most  rows and at most   columns of cells. Let  be the result of reflecting  in the line . Let .

Ford circles

There is a connection between Farey sequence and Ford circles.

Two Ford circles for different fractions are either disjoint or they are tangent to one another—two Ford circles never intersect.

Thus C[] is tangent to C[], C[], C[], C[], etc.

Ford circles appear also in the Apollonian gasket (0,0,1,1). The picture below illustrates this together with Farey resonance lines.

Riemann hypothesis
Farey sequences are used in two equivalent formulations of the Riemann hypothesis. Define , in other words  is the difference between the kth term of the nth Farey sequence, and the kth member of a set of the same number of points, distributed evenly on the unit interval. In 1924 Jérôme Franel proved that the statement

 

is equivalent to the Riemann hypothesis, and then Edmund Landau remarked (just after Franel's paper) that the statement
 

is also equivalent to the Riemann hypothesis.

Other sums involving Farey fractions 
The sum of all Farey fractions of order n is half the number of elements:
 

The sum of the denominators in the Farey sequence is twice the sum of the numerators and relates to Euler's totient function:

 

which was conjectured by Harold L. Aaron in 1962 and demonstrated by Jean A. Blake in 1966. A one line proof of the Harold L. Aaron conjecture is as follows.
The sum of denominators is
.

Let bj be the ordered denominators of Fn, then:

and
 

Let aj/bj the jth Farey fraction in Fn, then
 

which is demonstrated in. Also according to this reference the term inside the sum can be expressed in many different ways:
 

obtaining thus many different sums over the Farey elements with same result. Using the symmetry around 1/2 the former 
sum can be limited to half of the sequence as
 

The Mertens function can be expressed as a sum over Farey fractions as

   where      is the Farey sequence of order n.

This formula is used in the proof of the Franel–Landau theorem.

Next term
A surprisingly simple algorithm exists to generate the terms of Fn in either traditional order (ascending) or non-traditional order (descending). The algorithm computes each successive entry in terms of the previous two entries using the mediant property given above. Since  is in lowest terms,  there must be an integer k such that kc = a + p and kd = b + q, giving p = kc − a and q = kd − b. If we consider p and q to be functions of k, then

To give the next term in the sequence k must be as large as possible, subject to kd − b ≤ n (as we are only considering numbers with denominators not greater than n), so k is the greatest integer ≤ . Putting this value of k back into the equations for p and q gives

This is implemented in Python as follows:
def farey_sequence(n: int, descending: bool = False) -> None:
    """Print the n'th Farey sequence. Allow for either ascending or descending."""
    (a, b, c, d) = (0, 1, 1, n)
    if descending:
        (a, c) = (1, n - 1)
    print("{0}/{1}".format(a, b))
    while (c <= n and not descending) or (a > 0 and descending):
        k = (n + b) // d
        (a, b, c, d) = (c, d, k * c - a, k * d - b)
        print("{0}/{1}".format(a, b))

Brute-force searches for solutions to Diophantine equations in rationals can often take advantage of the Farey series (to search only reduced forms). While this code uses the first two terms of the sequence to initialize a, b, c, and d, one could substitute any pair of adjacent terms in order to exclude those less than (or greater than) a particular threshold.

See also
 ABACABA pattern
 Stern–Brocot tree
 Euler's totient function

Footnotes

References

Further reading
 
  — in particular, see §4.5 (pp. 115–123), Bonus Problem 4.61 (pp. 150, 523–524), §4.9 (pp. 133–139), §9.3, Problem 9.3.6 (pp. 462–463).
  — reviews the isomorphisms of the Stern-Brocot Tree.
  — reviews connections between Farey Fractions and Fractals.
   
  Errata + Code

External links
 
 
 
 
 
 
 
 
 Archived at Ghostarchive and the Wayback Machine: 

Fractions (mathematics)
Number theory
Sequences and series